A Bedtime Story is a 1933 American pre-Code romantic comedy film starring Maurice Chevalier.

Plot
Chevalier plays a Parisian playboy who finds himself obliged to care for an abandoned baby. The film was directed by Norman Taurog and also stars Edward Everett Horton, Helen Twelvetrees, and Baby LeRoy (in his film debut, as the baby).

Production problem
The film was notable for the performance of Baby LeRoy, a one-year-old who had been selected from an orphanage by Chevalier and Taurog for his charming appeal. When certain scenes needed to be re-shot, they found that the baby had grown two front teeth, even though the later scenes would be showing the bare gums. There was no way round this.

Cast
Maurice Chevalier  as Monsieur Rene
Helen Twelvetrees  as Sally
Edward Everett Horton  as Victor Dubois
Adrienne Ames  as Paulette
Baby LeRoy  as Monsieur "Baby"
Earle Foxe  as Max de l'Enclos
Leah Ray  as Mademoiselle Gabrielle
Betty Lorraine  as Suzanne Dubois
Gertrude Michael  as Louise
Ernest Wood  as Robert
Reginald Mason  as General Louse's father
Henry Kolker  as Agent de Police
George MacQuarrie  as Henry Joudain
Paul Panzer  as Concierge
Frank Reicher  as Aristide
George Barbier as Toy Seller 
Florence Roberts as Flower Shop Customer (uncredited)

References

External links 
 
 

1933 films
1933 musical comedy films
1933 romantic comedy films
American musical comedy films
American romantic comedy films
American romantic musical films
Films directed by Norman Taurog
Films set in Paris
Paramount Pictures films
American black-and-white films
1930s romantic musical films
1930s American films